Deen Next Stage is the ninth studio album by Japanese pop band Deen. It was released on 25 February 2009 under BMG Japan.

Background
The release gasp between previous album Diamonds are two and half year.
It makes the biggest release gasp of recording in their whole career.

The album consists of only one previously released single, Eien no Ashita.

Leader Kouji Yamane will perform in the album his solo song "Lonely Wolf".

Leading track Eien no Ashita has received special ballad version exclusively for this album.

This album was released in two formats: regular CD edition and limited CD+DVD edition. In DVD disc is countdown live from their performance Deen Live Joy Break-13~Next Stage~.

This is their last album which was released under BMG Japan. On their next album Lovers Concerto, they moved to different music label, Ariola Japan.

Charting performance
The album reached #16 in its first week and charted for 3 weeks, selling 12,000 copies.

Track listing

In media
Eien no Ashita - theme song for Nintendo DS game Tales of Hearts

References

Sony Music albums
Japanese-language albums
2009 albums
Deen (band) albums